The Diocese of Western China, also known as Diocese of Szechwan or Hua Hsi Diocese, was an Anglican diocese in late-Qing-dynasty and Republican China, established in 1895, under the supervision of the Church of England. It had belonged to the Church in China since its outset, and had been part of the Chinese Anglican Church since 1912. In 1936, it was divided into the Diocese of East Szechwan and Diocese of West Szechwan.

History 

The Cambridge Seven, who were missionaries to China through the China Inland Mission (CIM), arrived in Shanghai in 1885. Three of them —William Cassels, Arthur T. Polhill-Turner and Montagu Proctor-Beauchamp— were sent up by the CIM into the Western Province of Szechwan, where they established a proper Church of England diocese. Arthur's elder brother, Cecil H. Polhill-Turner, felt drawn towards the people of Tibet, went to Tatsienlu, a Khams Tibetan city within Szechwan, and he had laboured on the Sino and Indo-Tibetan borders since then.

At the close of 1891, the Rev J H Horsburgh of the Church Missionary Society (CMS), along with his wife Mrs Horsburgh, the Rev O M Jackson, three laymen, and six single women missionaries, entered Szechwan as the first band of CMS missionaries to take up work in that province. By 1894, CMS work had started in Mienchow, Chungpa, Anhsien, Mienchu and Sintu, all of which are in the west of the region. Meanwhile the CIM workers, based in Paoning, were also breaking ground in East Szechwan.

In 1895, steps were taken for the formation of a new diocese, due to the fact that the Church was represented by two Societies on the field. Cassels was eventually consecrated Bishop of Western China on 18 October 1895, in Westminster Abbey. As aforementioned, the CMS worked the western portion, the CIM the eastern portion. But after Cassels's consecration, the work was being more and more co-ordinated under his guidance.

The diocesan newsletter, The Bulletin of the Diocese of Western China, was founded in 1904. It was renamed several times during its 54-year run, with the last print published in 1958.

A Chinese translation of the Book of Common Prayer was published in 1932, revised and authorized for use in the Diocese of Szechwan.

The Diocese was split into Dioceses of East Szechwan and West Szechwan in 1936.

Bishops and assistant bishops

Western China 
 1895–1925: William Cassels
 1926–1933: Howard Mowll
 1933–1936: John Holden

Assistant bishops 
 1922–1926: Howard Mowll
 1929–1936: Ku Ho-lin
 1929–1936: Song Cheng-chih

East Szechwan 
 1936–1940: Frank Houghton
 1940–1950: K G Bevan
 1950–19??:

Assistant bishops 
 1936–1947: Ku Ho-lin

West Szechwan 
 1936–1937: John Holden
 1937–1950: Song Cheng-chih

Assistant bishops 
 1936–1937: Song Cheng-chih
 1943–1950: H A Maxwell

See also 
 Brook Hannah
 Vyvyan Donnithorne
 Canadian Methodist Mission in Szechwan
 Gospel Church, Wanhsien
 Protestantism in Szechwan
 Roman Catholic dioceses in Szechwan
 :Category:Anglican dioceses in China
 Category:Former Anglican churches in Szechwan

References